Reach Out may refer to:

In music:
 Reach Out (Four Tops album), 1967
 "Reach Out I'll Be There", also known as "Reach Out (I'll Be There)", a song by Four Tops
 Reach Out (Burt Bacharach album), 1967
 Reach Out! (Hank Mobley album), 1968
 Reach Out! (Hal Galper album), 1977
 Reach Out (S.E.S. album)
 Reach Out: The Motown Record, an album by Human Nature
 "Reach Out" (Cheap Trick song)
 "Reach Out" (Hilary Duff song)
 "Reach Out" (Take That song)
 "Reach Out", a song by George Duke from Guardian of the Light, 1983
 "Reach Out", a song by Bethany Dillon from Stop & Listen
 "Reach Out", a song by Iron Maiden, B-side of the single "Wasted Years"
 "Reach Out", a song by James Morrison from Higher Than Here
 "Reach Out", a song by Westlife from Where We Are
 "Reach Out" (Giorgio Moroder song), the track-and-field theme song for the 1984 Summer Olympics by Giorgio Moroder and Paul Engemann
 "Reach Out", a song by Sufjan Stevens and Angelo De Augustine from the album A Beginner's Mind

In organizations:
 ReachOut.com, an internet mental-health support service for teens and young adults
 ReachOut Healthcare America
 ReachOut an app by Kyle Kashuv

See also 
 Outreach, an effort by an organization to connect to others
 Reaching Out (disambiguation)